Sterling Price Newberry (August 10, 1915 – January 28, 2017) was an American inventor and microscopist. He was born in Springfield, Missouri. Newberry invented the shadow X-ray microscope and was one of the founders of the Microscopy Society of America. He turned 100 in August 2015 and died in January 2017 at the age of 101.

The first X-ray microscopes had used grazing off lenses at a very low angle to focus X-ray images. The images, however, were blurry from diffraction. While working on an alternate approach for General Electric, a technician came to him with a badge. The technician did not believe there were X-Rays in the machine, he had taken his warning badge, with X-ray film, and placed a bit of screen wire on it. He pulled the badge out and saw the exposed screen wire pattern on it. He also saw another screen wire pattern, however, far smaller and finer. Newberry recognized that the fine pattern was the screen wire mounting for the specimen, but that it was 400-to-the-inch wire and that it had been magnified by expansion of the shadow. This gave him the insight he needed to create a working commercial microscope, placing the specimen very close to a point source of X-rays and then farther back a photographic plate. The "shadow" of the specimen would be under-exposed, that is X-ray dark, on the plate. This process is similar to medical X-rays, except that the microscope uses a point source for clarity whereas a medical x-ray tends to use a much larger x-ray source to avoid distortion.

References

External links
  Early electron microscope
  Microscopy Society of America

1915 births
2017 deaths
20th-century American inventors
American centenarians
Men centenarians